Scott Wike (April 6, 1834 – January 15, 1901) was a U.S. Representative from Illinois.

Born in Meadville, Pennsylvania, Wike moved with his parents to Quincy, Illinois, in 1838 and to Pike County in 1844.
He graduated from Lombard University in Galesburg in 1857.
He studied law.
He was admitted to the bar in 1858.
Wike graduated from Harvard Law School in 1859 and commenced practice the same year in Pittsfield, Illinois.
He served as member of the State house of representatives 1863-1867.

Wike was elected as a Democrat to the Forty-fourth Congress (March 4, 1875 – March 3, 1877).
He was an unsuccessful candidate for renomination in 1876 to the Forty-fifth Congress.

Wike was elected to the Fifty-first and Fifty-second Congresses (March 4, 1889 – March 3, 1893).
He was an unsuccessful candidate for renomination in 1892.
He was appointed an Assistant Secretary of the Treasury during the second administration of President Cleveland and served from July 1, 1893, to May 4, 1897.
He resumed the practice of law in Pittsfield, Illinois.
He died near Barry, Illinois, on January 15, 1901.

References

1834 births
1901 deaths
People from Meadville, Pennsylvania
Democratic Party members of the Illinois House of Representatives
Illinois lawyers
Harvard Law School alumni
Lombard College alumni
Democratic Party members of the United States House of Representatives from Illinois
19th-century American politicians
People from Pittsfield, Illinois
People from Quincy, Illinois